Erība-Adad II, inscribed mSU-dIM, “Adad has replaced,” was the king of Assyria 1056/55–1054 BC, the 94th to appear on the Assyrian Kinglist. He was the son of Aššur-bēl-kala whom he briefly succeeded and was deposed by his uncle Šamši-Adad IV.

Biography 
The Khorsabad kinglist mistakenly gives him as a son of Ilu-kabkabi, i.e. the father of the 18th century BC king Šamši-Adad I. Despite his short two-year reign, there are fragmentary inscriptions where he claims his rule extended to the Aramaeans and lists conquests far and wide in intense military campaigns, imitating those of Tukultī-apil-Ešarra I, for which he styled himself “king of the four quarters.” He would have appeared on a destroyed section of the eponym list designated as Cc.

He was one of the restorers of the é.ḫur.sağ.kur.kur.ra, “House, Mountain of the Lands,” or the cella of the temple of the god Aššur, as commemorated in one of his inscriptions. A fragmentary literary text is dated to his reign. The Synchronistic Kinglist gives his name, but the Babylonian counterpart is illegible, possibly having been Simbar-Šipak based on the sequence of kings before and after. This chronicle seems quite fanciful in its chronology during the Assyrian dark-age. In any case, the king Adad-apla-iddina would have been his contemporary, sheltering his uncle, Šamši-Adad IV in political exile while he regrouped and planned his putsch. Although Aššur-bēl-kala had married Adad-apla-iddina’s daughter, it seems unlikely that Adad-apla-iddina would have then participated in an effort to depose his own grandson, so it seems likely that Erība-Adad was the issue of another queen and the Babylonian king’s change of attitude due to earlier political events in Assyria. His rule came to an end when Šamši-Adad “went up Kardun]iaš He drove Erība-Adad, from the throne.”

An Aššur monumental stele (number 27) from the Stelenreihe, "row of stelae," has been attributed to him and is inscribed laconically:  "Erība-adad, king of the universe".

Inscriptions

References 

11th-century BC Assyrian kings